A persistence module is a mathematical structure in persistent homology and topological data analysis that formally captures the persistence of topological features of an object across a range of scale parameters. A persistence module often consists of a collection of homology groups (or vector spaces if using field coefficients) corresponding to a filtration of topological spaces, and a collection of linear maps induced by the inclusions of the filtration. The concept of a persistence module was first introduced in 2005 as an application of graded modules over polynomial rings, thus importing well-developed algebraic ideas from classical commutative algebra theory to the setting of persistent homology. Since then, persistence modules have been one of the primary algebraic structures studied in the field of applied topology.

Definition

Single Parameter Persistence Modules 
Let  be a partially ordered set (poset) and let  be a field. The poset  is sometimes called the indexing set.

Multiparameter Persistence Modules 
In the case of a -module  where  is a single partially ordered set (e.g., etc.), we say that  is a single- or 1-parameter persistence module.

In this case, a -persistence module is referred to as an -dimensional or -parameter persistence module, or simply a multiparameter or multidimensional module if the number of parameters is already clear from context.

Multidimensional persistence modules were first introduced in 2009 by Carlsson and Zomorodian. Since then, there has been a significant amount of research into the theory and practice of working with multidimensional modules, since they provide more structure for studying the shape of data. Namely, multiparameter modules can have greater density sensitivity and robustness to outliers than single-parameter modules, making them a potentially useful tool for data analysis.

One downside of multiparameter persistence is its inherent complexity. This makes performing computations related to multiparameter persistence modules difficult. In the worst case, the computational complexity of multidimensional persistent homology is exponential.

Examples

Homology Modules 
When using homology with coefficients in a field, a homology group has the structure of a vector space.

Homology modules are the most ubiquitous examples of persistence modules, as they encode information about the number and scale of topological features of an object (usually derived from building a filtration on a point cloud) in a purely algebraic structure, thus making understanding the shape of the data amenable to algebraic techniques, imported from well-developed areas of mathematics such as commutative algebra and representation theory.

Interval Modules 
A primary concern in the study of persistence modules is whether modules can be decomposed into "simpler pieces", roughly speaking. In particular, it is algebraically and computationally convenient if a persistence module can be expressed as a direct sum of smaller modules known as interval modules.

Let  be a nonempty subset of a poset . Then  is an interval in  if

 For every  if  then 

Now given an interval  we can define a persistence module index-wise as follows:

; .

The module  is called an interval module.

Free Modules 
Let . Then we can define a persistence module  with respect to  where the spaces are given by

, and the maps defined via .

Then  is known as a free (persistence) module.

One can also define a free module in terms of decomposition into interval modules. For each  define the interval , sometimes called a "free interval." Then a persistence module  is a free module if there exists a multiset  such that . In other words, a module is a free module if it can be decomposed as a direct sum of free interval modules.

Properties

Finite Type Conditions 

 Each vector space  is finite-dimensional.
 There exists an integer  such that the map  is an isomorphism for all .

If  satisfies the first condition, then  is commonly said to be pointwise finite-dimensional (p.f.d.). The notion of pointwise finite-dimensionality immediately extends to arbitrary indexing sets.

The definition of finite type can also be adapted to continuous indexing sets. Formally speaking, this requires that for all but a finite number of points  there is a neighborhood  of  such that  for all , and also that there is some  such that  for all . A module satisfying only the former property is sometimes labeled essentially discrete, whereas a module satisfying both properties is known as essentially finite.

Note that this condition is redundant if the other finite type conditions above are satisfied, so it is not typically included in the definition, but is relevant in certain circumstances.

Structure Theorem 
One of the primary goals in the study of persistence modules is to classify modules according to their decomposability into interval modules. A persistence module that admits a decomposition as a direct sum of interval modules is often simply called "interval decomposable." One of the primary results in this direction is that any p.f.d. persistence module indexed over a totally ordered set is interval decomposable. This is sometimes referred to as the "structure theorem for persistence modules."

The case when  is finite is a straightforward application of the structure theorem for finitely generated modules over a principal ideal domain. The generalized version of the structure theorem, i.e., for p.f.d. modules indexed over arbitrary totally ordered sets, was established by Botnan and Crawley-Boevey in 2019.

References 

Mathematics
Topology
Representation theory
Algebra